Magnus Victor Nedregotten (born 24 October 1990) is a Norwegian curler from Oslo. He currently plays third on Team Steffen Walstad.

Career

Juniors
Nedregotten represented Norway in three World Junior Curling Championships. At the 2010 World Junior Curling Championships he played lead for the Steffen Mellemseter. The team would finish in 5th place. At the 2011 World Junior Curling Championships, he played second for the team which would win a bronze medal. At the 2012 World Junior Curling Championships, Nedregotten played third for the Norwegian team, skipped by Markus Snøve Høiberg. The team would finish 4th.

Nedregotten would play on the Norwegian School of Sport Sciences team at both the 2013 and 2015 Winter Universiade, playing second in both events. In 2013, the team skipped by Høiberg finished 4th; in 2015, the team (skipped by Walstad) won the gold medal.

Mixed doubles

Nedregotten would find much of his success in mixed team and mixed doubles curling. In mixed doubles, Nedregotten and partner Kristin Moen Skaslien have represented Norway in the 2013, 2014, 2015, 2016, 2017 and 2019 World Mixed Doubles Curling Championships. The pair have finished 4th, 5th, 3rd, 9th, 5th and 9th respectively. They represented Norway in the mixed doubles tournament at the 2018 Winter Olympics. They lost the bronze medal game against the Olympic Athletes from Russia, but due to a positive testing of meldonium from Alexander Krushelnitskiy, their bronze medals were stripped and given to Nedregotten and Skaslien.

Nedregotten and Skaslien won the second leg of the 2018–19 Curling World Cup, defeating Switzerland's Jenny Perret and Martin Rios in the final. The pair also won the Grand Final of the Curling World Cup, defeating Canada's Laura Walker and Kirk Muyres in the final.

Mixed curling
Nedregotten has also represented Norway at the European Mixed Curling Championship, playing second for Walstad in both events. At the 2012 European Mixed Curling Championship, the team finished 5th, and at the 2014 European Mixed Curling Championship, the team brought back a silver medal for Norway.

Men's
Nedregotten won the Norwegian men's championship in 2016 with Høiberg skipping, though the team was not chosen to represent Norway at the World Championships. Walstad took over as skip of the team in 2016. Following a bronze medal performance at the 2017 Winter Universiade, the team qualified for the 2017 World Men's Curling Championship, where they finished 8th. The team also qualified for the 2018 World Men's Curling Championship, finishing in 5th place. The team also represented Norway at the 2018 European Curling Championships, finishing in 5th place.

Personal life
Nedregotten was also a competitive skier.  He attended the Norway School of Sports Sciences.

He is married to his mixed doubles partner Kristin Skaslien.

References

External links
 
 
 
 

1990 births
Living people
Norwegian male curlers
Sportspeople from Oslo
Sportspeople from Stavanger
Norwegian male alpine skiers
Universiade medalists in curling
Curlers at the 2018 Winter Olympics
Curlers at the 2022 Winter Olympics
Olympic curlers of Norway
Olympic silver medalists for Norway
Olympic bronze medalists for Norway
Olympic medalists in curling
Medalists at the 2018 Winter Olympics
Medalists at the 2022 Winter Olympics
Universiade gold medalists for Norway
Universiade bronze medalists for Norway
Competitors at the 2013 Winter Universiade
Competitors at the 2015 Winter Universiade
Competitors at the 2017 Winter Universiade
21st-century Norwegian people